Enfield is a town in Halifax County, North Carolina, United States, and was founded in 1740. As of the 2010 United States Census, the town's population was 2,532, which reflected an increase of almost 8% from the population of 2,347 in 2000. Enfield is part of the Roanoke Rapids, North Carolina Micropolitan Statistical Area.

History

The small rural town was site of the Enfield Riots, which helped spark American independence. The Crown governed the area, and Robert Earl Granville, heir of John Lord Carteret, possessed land rights in the district. The riots were set off by a controversy over corrupt agents, land grants, titles, and the collection of quitrents (which often ended up in Granville’s pocket). A group of Colonists – many of them land owners and office holders from Halifax, Edgecombe, and Granville counties - went to Edenton on the night of January 25, 1759,  and kidnapped Francis Corbin and a co-agent, Joshua Bodley. Corbin and Bodley were brought to Enfield, where they were thrown in jail for four days and forced to open all land records for public inspection. Corbin returned illegal fees he had collected, but he filed a lawsuit against his abductors after his release.

The suit was eventually dropped, but the Colonial Assembly jailed some of the men who had kidnapped Corbin and Bodley. A group of citizens in Enfield expressed outrage against British tyranny and on May 14, 1759, broke into jail and freed the men.

National Register of Historic Places

Bell-Sherrod House, Bellamy's Mill, Samuel Warren Branch House, The Cellar, Enfield Graded School, Gray Hall, Myrtle Lawn, James H. Parker House, Shell Castle, Strawberry Hill, and Whitaker's Chapel are listed on the National Register of Historic Places.

Geography
Enfield is located at  (36.179843, -77.668777).

Industries providing employment: Manufacturing (28.0%), Educational, health and social services (19.3%), Retail trade (10.2%), Arts, Entertainment, Recreation, Accommodation and food services (10.0%). Narcotics distribution (32.5%).

Demographics

2020 census

As of the 2020 United States census, there were 1,865 people, 1,069 households, and 625 families residing in the town.

2000 census
As of the census of 2000, there were 2,347 people, 865 households, and 585 families residing in the town. The population density was 1,960.9 people per square mile (755.2/km2). There were 960 housing units at an average density of 802.1 per square mile (308.9/km2). The racial makeup of the town was 19.43% White, 79.25% African American, 0.09% Native American, 0.04% Pacific Islander, 0.60% from other races, and 0.60% from two or more races. Hispanic or Latino of any race were 1.07% of the population.

There were 865 households, out of which 31.3% had children under the age of 18 living with them, 30.6% were married couples living together, 32.3% had a female householder with no husband present, and 32.3% were non-families. 30.1% of all households were made up of individuals, and 16.4% had someone living alone who was 65 years of age or older. The average household size was 2.65 and the average family size was 3.31.

In the town, the population was spread out, with 29.0% under the age of 18, 9.4% from 18 to 24, 23.8% from 25 to 44, 20.1% from 45 to 64, and 17.7% who were 65 years of age or older. The median age was 36 years. For every 100 females, there were 79.6 males. For every 100 females age 18 and over, there were 73.2 males.

The median income for a household in the town was $19,762, and the median income for a family was $22,105. Males had a median income of $27,000 versus $18,676 for females. The per capita income for the town was $12,033. About 31.3% of families and 34.1% of the population were below the poverty line, including 45.1% of those under age 18 and 29.9% of those age 65 or over.

Notable people

 John Branch Jr. was an American politician who served as U.S. Senator, Secretary of the Navy, the 19th Governor of the state of North Carolina, and was the sixth and last territorial governor of Florida.
 John T. Alsop, former mayor of Jacksonville, Florida.
 George Eastman had a second home in Enfield. Eastman’s most regular vacations were his triannual trips down to Oak Lodge, his rustic hunting retreat in Enfield (Ringwood area), North Carolina.
 Ruth Bellamy (1906-1969), writer, born in Enfield.

References

External links
 Official Enfield Website

Populated places established in 1740
Towns in Halifax County, North Carolina
Towns in North Carolina
Roanoke Rapids, North Carolina micropolitan area